All Platinum Records was a record company started in 1967 by singer/writer/producer Sylvia Robinson and her husband, businessman Joe Robinson, who had previously worked in the recording industry.
 
All Platinum and its subsidiary labels, including Stang, Vibration, Turbo and Astroscope, specialised in soul and R&B music. Many of the company's releases were recorded at its Soul Sound Studios, using the company's in-house musicians, at its Englewood, New Jersey base. The company released four singles that reached number one on the Billboard R&B chart but failed to top the Hot 100 pop chart.

The label started as Platinum Records but the prefix of 'All' was added to avoid confusion with a Miami label. The company, with Sylvia helming the creative operations as well as producing or co-producing many releases, racked up a series of R&B and Pop hits during the 70s, despite being only a small independent concern.

The company's mainstay act was the all-male group, The Moments (later Ray, Goodman & Brown) whose first hit at the end of 1968 launched the Stang label, "Not On The Outside" (#13 Billboard R&B, #57 pop). The group, with a few early personnel changes, stayed with the company for ten years, resulting in over 25 R&B hits and 15 Hot 100 entries. These included the million-seller, "Love on a Two-Way Street" in 1970 (#1 R&B, #3 pop) and another R&B chart-topper, "Look at Me (I'm in Love)", which also reached #39 on the pop chart in 1975. The group's Harry Ray and Al Goodman branched out as writers and producers in their later years at the company.

Other major hits for the All-Platinum labels included Sylvia's own million-selling "Pillow Talk" in 1973 (#1 R&B, #3 pop);  Shirley & Company's "Shame, Shame, Shame" in 1975 (#1 R&B, #12 pop); Donnie Elbert's version of "Where Did Our Love Go" in 1971 (#6 R&B, #15 pop); Brother To Brother's "In The Bottle" in 1974 (#9 R&B, #46 pop); Linda Jones' "Your Precious Love" in 1972 (#15 R&B, #74 pop);  and The Whatnauts' 1971 hit, "I'll Erase Away Your Pain" (#14 R&B, #71 pop).

The Moments also had considerable success in the UK with three Top 10 hits including "Girls" (#3) in 1975 and All Platinum also had its own label in the UK for a few years during the mid-1970s.

All Platinum purchased Chess Records with assistance from the European record concern, PolyGram in 1975, after Chess fell into bankruptcy. However, the move was not a success as All Platinum was unable to keep steadily releasing material from Chess's roster of artists.

The Robinsons launched a new subsidiary label, Sugar Hill Records in 1979 to concentrate on the fast-emerging rap/hip hop music scene. Sylvia switched her efforts to the new label completely, following early major success with "Rapper's Delight" (1979) and then "The Message" (1982), as the company's other labels went quiet. Sugar Hill as a label came to an end in 1986 after a disagreement with distributors, MCA, resulted in protracted litigation.

The Robinsons maintained their studio operation through to 2002 when the Englewood studios (by then, renamed Sugar Hill Studios) burnt down in a fire. Joe Robinson had died two years earlier and then Sylvia died in hospital in 2011 at the age of 75.

Artists
Jesus Alvarez
Hank Ballard
Brook Benton
Brother to Brother
Dave "Baby" Cortez
Donnie Elbert
First Class
Chuck Jackson
Linda Jones
George Kerr
Derek Martin
Eleanore Mills
The O'Jays
The Good Rats ( One Album only- "Ratcity in Blue")
Bobby Patterson
Ponderosa Twins Plus One
The Moments
Irene Reed
The Rimshots
Shirley & Company
Larry Saunders
Spoonbread
Sylvia
Lezli Valentine
The Whatnauts
Willie & The Mighty Magnificents
Timothy Wilson
Retta Young
Lonnie Youngblood

See also
 List of record labels

Footnotes

American record labels
Record labels established in 1967
Record labels disestablished in 1974
1967 establishments in the United States
Virtual reality companies